The Ambassador Extraordinary and Plenipotentiary of the Russian Federation to the Republic of the Philippines is the official representative of the President and the Government of the Russian Federation to the President and the Government of the Philippines.

The ambassador and his staff work at large in the Embassy of Russia in Manila. The ambassador to the Philippines is also the non-resident ambassador to Palau, the Marshall Islands, and Micronesia.

History of diplomatic relations

The Russian Empire's far eastern expansion during the nineteenth century brought it into contact with the countries of Southeast Asia, which provided a source of food and raw materials for the new territories, which could not be easily supplied from within the empire. Peter Dobell, an Irish-born American businessman living in the region, arranged for trade relations with the Russian Far East, and was in 1817 appointed the Russian consul general in Manila under the name Pyotr Vasilievich Dobel. He acted as an unofficial representative of the Russian government, a role later fulfilled largely by French merchants prior to the 1917 revolution. Following the establishment of Soviet rule, links were initially maintained via the Communist International, but gradually died out in the face of official Philippine opposition. Following Philippine independence in 1946, the national government continued the previous policy of not establishing relations with socialist countries. This changed in 1965 with the new President, Ferdinand Marcos, who sought links with socialist countries as new markets for exports.

Trade and political links were developed and strengthened during the 1960s and 1970s, and in 1976, following Ferdinand Marcos's first state visit to the USSR on 2 June 1976, a communiqué was issued, establishing diplomatic relations. Both countries began to exchange ambassadors from 1977 onwards. With the dissolution of the Soviet Union in 1991, the Philippines recognised the Russian Federation as its successor state on 28 December 1991.  The incumbent Soviet ambassador, continued to serve as representative of Russia until 1996.

List of representatives (1977 – present)

Representatives of the Soviet Union to the Philippines (1977 – 1991)

Representatives of the Russian Federation to the Philippines (1991 – present)

References

 
Philippines
Russia